The men's high jump competition of the athletics events at the 2019 Pan American Games will take place on the 9 of August at the 2019 Pan American Games Athletics Stadium. The defending Pan American Games champion is Derek Drouin from Canada.

Summary
Four men made it over 2.26m; Luis Zayas, Michael Mason and Roberto Vílches, on their second try and Fernando Ferreira on his third.  Zayas and Vilches had an earlier miss each, putting Mason into the lead.  Zayas cleared 2.28 to take the lead, Mason got over on his second attempt.  Vilches was left with bronze when he and Ferreira couldn't make the height.  At , Zayas made his personal best on his second attempt.  Mason then passed to try to make 2.32m, 1 cm below his best, for the win.

Records
Prior to this competition, the existing world and Pan American Games records were as follows:

Schedule

Results
All times shown are in meters.

Final
The results were as follows

References

Athletics at the 2019 Pan American Games
2019